Guan Sheng is a fictional character in Water Margin, one of the Four Great Classical Novels of Chinese literature. Nicknamed "Great Blade", he ranks fifth among the 36 Heavenly Spirits, the first third of the 108 Stars of Destiny.

Background
A descendant of Guan Yu, Guan Sheng resembles his famous ancestor of the Three Kingdoms era. His height of eight chi and five/six cun, his flowing beard, his long eyebrows and his eyes which are like those of a fenghuang are features of Guan Yu. Guan Sheng's weapon is a guandao, just like his ancestor's, which earns him the nickname "Great Blade". His horse and that of Guan Yu are also similarly named "Red Rabbit". Though a skilled and talented warrior, Guan Sheng serves as a minor military inspector in a town east of Puzhou (蒲州; present-day Yuncheng, Shanxi).

Battle against Liangshan
When the outlaws of Liangshan Marsh attack Daming (present-day Daming County, Hebei) to rescue Lu Junyi and Shi Xiu, the Grand Tutor Cai Jing in the imperial capital Dongjing holds a meeting to discuss how to break the siege. Xuan Zan, a military officer, recommends Guan Sheng to Cai as the person who could save the prefecture. Cai summons Guan from Puzhou and appoints him to lead the military mission. Xuan Zan and Hao Siwen, whom Guan brings along to the capital, serve as his lieutenants. 

Using the strategy of "besieging Wei to rescue Zhao", Guan attacks Liangshan Marsh to force Song Jiang to withdraw from Daming to save his base. Before Song's force is back, Zhang Heng, one of Liangshan's flotilla leaders, stages an unsanctioned raid on Guan's camp with some men in a bid to score merit for himself. He is captured in an ambush set by Guan. Ruan Xiaoqi, the only chieftain who knows of Zhang's derring-do, takes some men to rescue him but is also seized.

Life at Liangshan
Back at Liangshan, Song Jiang faces Guan Sheng. Impressed with Guan's looks and fighting prowess, Song swears he would win him over. He works out a plan with Huyan Zhuo, a general who has defected after failing in his imperial mission to stamp out Liangshan, to ensnare Guan. Huyan goes to Guan's camp alone claiming that he has reluctantly joined the bandits and now wants to clear his name. Guan believes Huyan's claim, especially after the latter falsely beat a Liangshan chieftain in a fight on horseback. Not smelling a rat, Guan follows Huyan on a night raid on Song Jiang's camp. He is surrounded, unhorsed by hooks and captured. Treated with great respect by Song Jiang, who vows that Liangshan is composed of reluctant rebels, Guan is touched and joins the bandits.  Xuan Zan and Hao Siwen, who are also captured, follow suit. Zhang Heng and Ruan Xiaoqi are freed. 

Told of Guan Sheng's defection, the imperial court orders Shan Tinggui and Wei Dingguo, military inspectors of Lingzhou (凌州; in present-day Dezhou, Shandong), to attack Liangshan. Guan volunteers to head them off by attacking Lingzhou with Xuan Zan and Hao Siwen  In the first fight at Lingzhou, Xuan and Hao are captured when lured into the battle ranks of Shan and Wei.

Guan Sheng challenges Shan Tinggui to a duel. He feigns defeat and lures Shan to pursue him. Suddenly Guan turns on his horse and whacks the pursuer off with one swing of his big blade. Instead of moving in to kill, Guan gets off his horse and converses with Shan warmly, winning the latter's heart. They return to fight Wei, who scalds Guan's men with incendiary materials. But outlaws led by Li Kui have broken into Lingzhou, forcing Wei to flee to a county. Shan enters the small town to persuade him to surrender. But Wei insists that Guan must come alone. When Guan appears without any protection, Wei wholeheartedly lays down his arms.

Death

Guan Sheng is appointed as one of the Five Tiger Generals of the Liangshan cavalry after the 108 Stars of Destiny came together in what is called the Grand Assembly. He participates in the campaigns against the Liao invaders and rebel forces in Song territory following amnesty from Emperor Huizong for Liangshan. 

Guan Sheng survives the series of campaigns and is appointed as military commander of Daming. One day, he gets drunk when celebrating a successful military drill and later falls off his horse. He becomes critically ill and dies a few days later.

References
 
 
 
 
 
 
 

36 Heavenly Spirits
Chinese gods
Fictional characters from Shanxi